This is a list of members of the Massachusetts House of Representatives during the colonial era. For members of the Massachusetts House after the ratification of the Massachusetts Constitution in 1780, see :Category:Members of the Massachusetts House of Representatives.

A 
 Samuel Adams 
 Humphrey Atherton
 Peter Atherton

B 
 William Brattle
James Bowdoin

C 
John Chandler (sheriff) 
John Cogswell
James Converse
Elisha Cooke Sr.
Elisha Cooke Jr.
George Cooke (Massachusetts politician)
Thomas Cushing
Thomas Cushing II

D 
Richard Dana (lawyer)
Thomas Drury (1668)

E 
Joseph Ellis Jr.

F 
 Anthony Fisher (Massachusetts politician)
Joshua Fisher (Massachusetts politician)

G 
Nathaniel Gorham
Stephen Greenleaf
Jeremiah Gridley
John Grout

H 
Robert Hale (doctor)
John Hancock
Thomas Hastings (colonist) 
Joseph Hawley (Massachusetts politician)
Thomas Hutchinson (governor)

J 
Nehemiah Jewett

L 
John Leavitt
Benjamin Lincoln
Samuel Livermore (1768–1769)

O 
Andrew Oliver
Azor Orne
James Otis Sr. 
James Otis Jr.

P 
Robert Treat Paine
Joseph Parsons Jr.
William Phillips Sr.

Q 
Edmund Quincy (1628-1698)
John Quincy

R 
Edmund Rice (colonist)
Thomas Rice (1654)
Thomas Rice (1734)
John Rowe (merchant)
Timothy Ruggles

S 
Robert Sedgwick
Joseph Sherman (Massachusetts Bay Colony)

T 
Josiah Taft

W 
Samuel White (Massachusetts politician)

See also
Massachusetts Charter
Boston Board of Selectmen
List of colonial governors of Massachusetts

External links
 Boston Public Library. Boston Record Commissioner's Reports
Massachusetts Bay (Colony) Treasury accounts (1699) Massachusetts Bay (Colony) Treasury accounts (1699)

References

Members of the colonial Massachusetts House of Representatives
People of colonial Massachusetts
Government of colonial Massachusetts